The United States's Flintlock nuclear test series was a group of 47 nuclear tests conducted in 1965–1966. These tests  followed the Operation Whetstone series and preceded the Operation Latchkey series.

Nuclear tests

Duryea
Following emplacement of the Duryea nuclear device and stemming of the shot hole, several instrument cables failed and a plan was devised to repair them.

List of nuclear tests

References

Explosions in 1965
Explosions in 1966
1965 in military history
1966 in military history
Flintlock